Low Westwood is a village in County Durham, England. It is situated immediately to the west of Hamsterley. Low Westwood is probably best known for Hamsterley Christ Church and Derwent care home.

Geography
The River Derwent flows at the bottom of the valley, and separates the nearby villages of Blackhall Mill and Chopwell. Although situated in County Durham, Low Westwood has a Newcastle-upon-Tyne postcode (NE17).

Transport
Low Westwood lies just off the A694, and is on the 'Red kite' (45/46) Go North East bus route which runs from Consett to Newcastle upon Tyne. There are also regular bus links to Chopwell, and a free Tesco bus which runs once or twice a day between Chopwell and the Delve's Lane Tesco.

Low Westwood lies just off the Derwent Cycle Path, which runs from Consett to Gateshead.

Nightlife
Low Westwood and Hamsterley had one pub between them, The Cronniewell, a popular pub/nightclub. This has recently closed and is now an Italian restaurant. There are two pubs in Ebchester about 15 minutes' walk away.

Economy
Low Westwood saw a huge economic boom in the late 19th century, with the establishment of many of its residential properties, built with a yellow grey Durham stone, iconic of the area. These are typical of thriving North Durham villages. Many newer houses, flats and apartments have been built within a mile radius in the style of these houses, an appreciation of the golden age of the late 19th Century.

The town benefits from local employment in larger nearby towns, such as Consett and Rowlands Gill.

References

Villages in County Durham
Consett